Kandahar University is a government funded higher learning institution in Kandahar, Afghanistan. It is one of two universities in southern Afghanistan. Kandahar University (KDRU) was established in 1990, at a time when the People's Democratic Party of Afghanistan (PDPA) was in power under President Mohammad Najibullah. Tooryalai Wesa, who returned to the country after 13 years and served as the governor of Kandahar province from 2008 to 2014, was the first chancellor of Kandahar University.

See also 
List of universities in Afghanistan

References

External links

Ministry of Education in Afghanistan

Universities in Afghanistan
Educational institutions established in 1991
1991 establishments in Afghanistan
Public universities in Afghanistan
Kandahar